Elections were held in Stormont, Dundas and Glengarry United Counties, Ontario on October 24, 2022 in conjunction with municipal elections across the province.

Stormont, Dundas and Glengarry United Counties Council
Council consists of the mayors and deputy mayors of each of the townships. It does not include the city of Cornwall.

North Dundas
The following were the results for mayor and deputy mayor of North Dundas.

Mayor
Incumbent mayor Tony Fraser was acclaimed in his bid for re-election.

Deputy mayor

North Glengarry
The following were the results for mayor and deputy mayor of North Glengarry.

Mayor
Mayor Jamie MacDonald was re-elected by acclamation.

Deputy mayor

North Stormont
The following were the results for mayor and deputy mayor of North Stormont.

Mayor
Deputy mayor Francois Landry ran for mayor.

Deputy mayor

South Dundas
The following were the results for mayor and deputy mayor of South Dundas.

Mayor
Running for mayor of South Dundas was deputy mayor Kirsten Gardner and former councillor Bill Ewing.

Deputy mayor

South Glengarry
The following were the results for mayor and deputy mayor of South Glengarry.

Mayor

Deputy mayor

South Stormont
The following were the results for mayor and deputy mayor of South Stormont.

Mayor
Incumbent mayor Bryan McGillis ran against deputy mayor David Smith.

Deputy mayor

References

Stormont
United Counties of Stormont, Dundas and Glengarry